Juan Pablo Romero (born January 30, 1990) is a Mexican boxer. He competed at the 2016 Summer Olympics in the men's welterweight event, in which he was eliminated in the round of 32 by Vincenzo Mangiacapre.

References

1990 births
Living people
Mexican male boxers
Olympic boxers of Mexico
Boxers at the 2016 Summer Olympics
Welterweight boxers
Boxers at the 2011 Pan American Games
Pan American Games competitors for Mexico